Scott James Stewart is an Australian politician. He has been the Labor member for Townsville in the Queensland Legislative Assembly since February 2015.

Stewart was a high school principal and educator in the Townsville region. He was the principal of Pimlico State High School when he contested the seat of Townsville.

During his time in education Scott established a boxing program, aimed at helping under-achieving indigenous students re-engage with schooling through sport.

Scott and his wife Jackie moved to Townsville in 1999 to raise their three children. He is a volunteer with Townsville Rotary and sits on several committees including the North Queensland Stadium Activation Group, Community Aviation Consultation Group, CBD Taskforce, Regional Economic Development Sub-Committee, Palm Island Economic Development and Palm Island Liveability Project.

Scott holds a Bachelor of Education and a master's degree from the Queensland University of Technology.

On 12 November 2020 he was appointed Minister for Resources.

References

Year of birth missing (living people)
Living people
Members of the Queensland Legislative Assembly
Australian Labor Party members of the Parliament of Queensland
21st-century Australian politicians
Labor Right politicians